Samoded is a rural locality (a settlement) located in the north of Plesetsky District of Arkhangelsk Oblast, Russia, on both banks of the Vaymuga River, a tributary of the Yemtsa River. Within the framework of municipal divisions, it serves as the administrative center of Samodedskoye Rural Settlement, one of the thirteen rural settlements in the district. Population:

History
It was established in July 1926 and named after Russian Civil War hero Grigory Samoded who was one of the organizers of the defense of the Plesetsk area from advancing American troops. The settlement was needed to serve a new sawmill. From March 2, 1928. Samoded was the administrative center of Samoded Settlement Soviet of Arkhangelsky Uyezd, Arkhangelsk Governorate. On July 15, 1929, the uyezds were abolished, and Samoded became a part of Plesetsky District of Northern Krai (from 1937, Arkhangelsk Oblast).

During World War II, it played an active part in supplying the Red Army with clothing and food and helped the families of soldiers, engaged in placing evacuees.

Samoded had work settlement status until it was demoted to a rural locality in February 2013.

Economy
The economy of the settlement is based mostly on the timber industry.

Samoded is located on the road connecting Kargopol with one of the principal highways in Russia, M8 between Moscow and Arkhangelsk (the highways meet in the village of Brin-Navolok). This is the historic trading route which connected Kargopol with Arkhangelsk before the railroad was built, and long stretches of this road are still unpaved.

References

Notes

Sources

Rural localities in Plesetsky District